The South African National Census of 2022 is the 4th comprehensive census performed by Statistics South Africa (Stats SA).

Collection issues 
The census taking period was extended in the Western Cape province to 14 May 2022 after it was announced that only 58% of the province's population had participated in it by late April that year; whilst around 80% of the country's whole population had be surveyed by the same date. The deadline was extended a second time in the Western Cape to 31 May as only 78% of the province's population had been counted by the end of the first extension period.

The issue of under-counting in the Western Cape Province was a serious issue of concern for the Western Cape Provincial government as it might result in fewer resources being allocated to the province by national government on a per-capita basis relative to the rest of the country. 

Stats SA reported particular difficulty in getting an accurate census count of both white and coloured residents which accounted for the low census participation rate in the Western Cape province. In the Western Cape census workers reported difficulty in contacting households with high walls - thereby preventing many surveys from being conducted - whilst other households refused to participate in the census. Other problems encountered by Stats SA in the province included not being able to hire enough census workers or being able to secure enough vehicles.

See also

 South African National Census of 2001
 South African National Census of 2011
 Demographics of South Africa

References

External links
 Statistics Act of 1999

Censuses in South Africa
2022 in South Africa
2022 censuses